Botriopsis is a genus of bristle flies in the family Tachinidae.

Species
Botriopsis bakeri Townsend, 1928

Distribution
Philippines

References

Diptera of Asia
Exoristinae
Tachinidae genera
Taxa named by Charles Henry Tyler Townsend